San Diego International Airport , formerly known as Lindbergh Field, is an international airport  northwest of Downtown San Diego, California, United States. It is owned and operated by the San Diego County Regional Airport Authority. There are more than 70 nonstop markets in the US and abroad.

San Diego International Airport is the busiest single-runway airport in the world. The airport's landing approach is well known for its close proximity to the skyscrapers of Downtown San Diego, and can sometimes prove difficult to pilots for the relatively short usable landing area, steep descent angle over the crest of Bankers Hill, and shifting wind currents just before landing. San Diego International operates in controlled airspace served by the Southern California TRACON, which is some of the busiest airspace in the world.

History

Prior to the development of the airport, the area was a delta river outlet for the San Diego River into the San Diego Bay, which was then re routed to terminate to the Pacific Ocean parallel to Mission Bay.

The airport is near the site of the Ryan Airlines factory, but it is not the same as Dutch Flats Airport, the Ryan airfield where Charles Lindbergh flight-tested the Spirit of St. Louis before his historic 1927 transatlantic flight. The site of Dutch Flats is on the other side of the Marine Corps Recruit Depot, in the Midway neighborhood, near the intersection of Midway and Barnett avenues.

Inspired by Lindbergh's flight and excited to have made his plane, the city of San Diego passed a bond issue in 1928 for the construction of a two-runway municipal airport. Lindbergh encouraged the building of the airport and agreed to lend his name to it. The new airport, dedicated on August 16, 1928, was San Diego Municipal Airport – Lindbergh Field with 140 Navy and 82 Army planes involved in a flyover.

The airport was the first federally certified airfield to serve all aircraft types, including seaplanes. The original terminal was on the northeast side of the field, on Pacific Highway. The airport was also a testing facility for several early US sailplane designs, notably those by William Hawley Bowlus (superintendent of construction on the Spirit of St. Louis) who also operated the Bowlus Glider School at Lindbergh Field from 1929 to 1930. The airport was also the site of a national and world record for women's altitude established in 1930 by Ruth Alexander. The airport was also the site of the first transcontinental glider tow by Capt. Frank Hawks departing Lindbergh Field on March 30, 1930, and ending in Van Cortland Park in New York City on April 6, 1930.  On June 1, 1930, a regular San Diego–Los Angeles airmail route started. The airport gained international airport status in 1934. In April 1937, United States Coast Guard Air Base was commissioned next to the airfield. The Coast Guard's fixed-wing aircraft used Lindbergh Field until the mid-1990s when their fixed-wing aircraft were assigned elsewhere.

A major defense contractor and contributor to World War II heavy bomber production, Consolidated Aircraft, later known as Convair, had their headquarters on the border of Lindbergh Field, and built many of their military aircraft there. Convair used the airport for test and delivery flights from 1935 to 1995.

The US Army Air Corps took over the field in 1942, improving it to handle the heavy bombers being manufactured in the region. Two camps were established at the airport during World War II and were named Camp Consair and Camp Sahara. This transformation, including an  runway, made the airport "jet-ready" long before jet airliners came into service. The May 1952 C&GS chart shows an 8,700-ft runway 9 and a 4,500-ft runway 13.

Pacific Southwest Airlines (PSA) established its headquarters in San Diego and started service at Lindbergh Field in 1949. The April 1957 Official Airline Guide shows 42 departures per day: 14 American, 13 United, 6 Western, 6 Bonanza, and 3 PSA (5 PSA on Friday and Sunday). American had a nonstop flight to Dallas and one to El Paso; aside from that, nonstop flights did not reach beyond California and Arizona. Nonstop flights to Chicago started in 1962 and to New York in 1967.

The first scheduled flights using jets at Lindbergh Field were in September 1960: American Airlines Boeing 720s to Phoenix and United Airlines 720s to San Francisco.

The original terminal was on the north side of the airport; the current Terminal 1 opened on the south side of the airport on March 5, 1967. Terminal 2 opened on July 11, 1979. These terminals were designed by Paderewski Dean & Associates. A third terminal, dubbed the Commuter Terminal, opened July 23, 1996. The expanded Terminal 2 and the Commuter Terminal were designed by Gensler and SGPA Architecture and Planning. The airport was built and operated by the City of San Diego through the sale of municipal bonds to be repaid by airport users. In 1962 it was transferred to the San Diego Unified Port District by a state law. In 2001 the San Diego County Regional Airport Authority was created, and assumed jurisdiction over the airport in December 2002. The Authority changed the airport's name from Lindbergh Field to San Diego International Airport in 2003, reportedly considering the new name "a better fit for a major commercial airport."

San Diego gained a nonstop transatlantic flight in March 2001, when British Airways eliminated the halt in Phoenix on its route to London. The airline had served San Diego intermittently since 1988; the flights always included a stopover, however. British Airways left the city in 2003 but returned eight years later.

Relocation proposals

In the jet age there have been concerns about a relatively small airport constrained by terrain serving as the area's primary airport; at one point acting Civil Aeronautics Authority administrator William B. Davis said he doubted any jet airline would use it. In 1950 the city acquired what is today Montgomery Field and much of the land surrounding it through eminent domain to build a new airport, but the Korean War brought with it a massive expansion in jet traffic to nearby Naval Air Station Miramar, which soon rendered a commercial service airport in the area impractical. The CAA refused to fund any major enhancements to SDIA through the 1950s, and at various times the city proposed NAS North Island, Mission Bay, and Brown Field as replacements. Cost, conflicts with the Navy, and potential interference with other air traffic stymied these plans.

It was not until 1964 that the FAA would finally agree to an expansion of SDIA, which at this point was over double the capacity of its 1940s era terminals, leading to the construction of today's Terminal 1. Even then, it was only allowed with the assurance of San Diego Mayor Charles Dail that it was only a temporary measure until a replacement could be found. From that time until 2006, various public agencies conducted studies on potential locations for a replacement airport. One revisited a study done in the 1980s by the City in 1994 when Naval Air Station Miramar closed and was then immediately transferred to the US Marine Corps as Marine Corps Air Station Miramar. Another was by the City of San Diego in 1984 and another that started in 1996 and sat dormant with SANDAG until the airport authority was formed. This is the first study ever done to look for a new site by a public agency that actually had jurisdiction over the issue, and the first non-site specific comprehensive study of the entire region.

California State Assembly Bill 93 created the San Diego County Regional Airport Authority (SDCRAA) in 2001. At the time, the SDCRAA projected SAN would be constrained by congestion between 2015 and 2022; the Great Recession, however, extended the forecast capacity limitations into the 2030s. In June 2006, SDCRAA board members selected Marine Corps Air Station Miramar as its preferred site for a replacement airport, despite military objections the compromises this would require would severely interfere with the readiness and training of aviators stationed at the air station. On November 7, 2006, San Diego County residents rejected an advisory relocation ballot that included a joint use proposal measure over these and related concerns over the potential impact reducing the region's military value would have on the defense-focused San Diego economy. Since then no public agency has placed forth a serious proposal to relocate SDIA, and the Airport Authority has stated it has no plans to do so for the foreseeable future.

Expansion
San Diego International Airport's expansion and enhancement program for Terminal 2 was dubbed "The Green Build". Additions include 10 gates on the west side of Terminal 2 West, a two-level roadway separating arriving and departing passengers, additional security lanes, and an expanded concession area.  It was completed on August 13, 2013, and cost US$900 million. In January 2016, the airport opened a new consolidated rental car facility on the airport's north side. The US$316 million,  facility houses 14 rental car companies and is served by shuttle buses to and from the terminals. A new three-story parking structure in front of Terminal 2 was launched in July 2016 and completed in May 2018.

The Airport Development Plan (ADP) is the next master-planning phase for San Diego International Airport. In 2006, a county-wide ballot measure to move the airport was defeated. Therefore, the airport will continue in its current location for the foreseeable future. The ADP identifies improvements that will enable the airport to meet demand through 2035, which is approximately when projected passenger activity levels will reach capacity for the airport's single runway. An additional runway is not under consideration.

The ADP envisions the replacement of Terminal 1 and related improvements. As a first step in the ADP, several potential concepts were developed. These concepts represented the first step in a comprehensive planning process.

Extensive public outreach was conducted to obtain input from residents and airport stakeholders in the San Diego region. The Airport Authority Board eventually selected a preferred alternative and a detailed environmental analysis is now under way. The environmental review and planning process is expected to conclude in spring 2017.

A new immigration and customs facility at Terminal 2 West began construction in 2017.  The new facility was completed in June 2018 and is almost five times the size of its predecessor. Prior to its completion, gates 20, 21, and 22 in Terminal 2 East handled international arrivals. These arrivals are now handled at gates 47, 48, 49, 50, and 51 in Terminal 2 West. The construction of the new facility was due to the sharp rise of international travel at the airport; international arrivals increased "from 50,000 passengers a year in 1990 to more than 400,000 a year in 2017."

San Diego International Airport is proceeding with a redevelopment plan, starting with reconstruction of Terminal 1. This work is scheduled to be completed by 2026. The number of gates will increase from 19 gates in the old Terminal 1 to 30 gates in the new Terminal 1. Other parts of the redevelopment plan include a 7,500-space parking structure, a new dual-level roadway in front of the new Terminal 1, and a new entry road. Further changes are scheduled in later years for Terminal 2, which will increase the total number of gates at San Diego International Airport to 61. Completion of these changes are not expected until 2035.

Facilities

Terminals
San Diego International Airport has two terminals and 48 gates:
 Terminal 1 has two concourses (East and West). The terminal currently has 14 gates (5-18), as gates 1, 1A, and 2 were recently demolished, as well as 3 and 4 soon after in early 2022, to make room for the construction of the New T1 project.
 Terminal 2 has two concourses (East and West), 32 gates, and three lounges (Delta Sky Club, United Club, and Aspire Lounge).
 Upcoming New T1 Projected to open in phases, between late 2023 and 2028. In 2019, the $3.4 billion redo of the outdated terminal 1 received approval from the California Coastal Commission. The New T1 expansion will include a new Administration Building, a new T1 parking plaza, and 30 new gates replacing the existing 19. After its completion in 2028, the airport will have a total of 62 gates.

Runway

The airport has one runway, designated 09/27 for its magnetic headings of 095 degrees (106 True) and 275 degrees (286 True). The runway, built of asphalt and concrete, measures . Each end has a displaced threshold: on Runway 27, the first  are displaced, while the first  are displaced on Runway 9.

Westerly winds predominate, so most takeoffs and landings use Runway 27. Nearby skyscrapers are no factor.

The final approach to Runway 27 has also gained notoriety among passengers for the unusual experience of flying relatively low and close to San Diego's densely populated downtown, and has drawn comparisons to Kansas City's Charles B. Wheeler Downtown Airport and Hong Kong's former Kai Tak Airport. From the left side of the aircraft, the approach offers closeup views of skyscrapers, Petco Park (home of the San Diego Padres), the San Diego Bay, and the San Diego–Coronado Bridge, while Balboa Park, site of the 1915–1916 Panama-California Exposition, can be seen on the right.

To appease the concerns of the airport's neighbors regarding noise and to head off any ensuing lawsuits, a curfew was implemented in 1979 whereby takeoffs are only allowed between 6:30 a.m. and 11:30 p.m. Outside these hours, they are subject to a large fine. Arrivals are permitted 24 hours per day. While several flights have scheduled departure times before 6:30 a.m., these are pushback times, and the first takeoff roll does not occur until 6:30 a.m.

Ground transportation
The airport is on North Harbor Drive, which is accessible from Interstate 5 northbound via the Hawthorn Street exit and southbound via the Sassafras Street exit. Short-term parking is located in front of both terminals: Terminal 2 has covered parking plaza and an outdoor lot, while Terminal 1 only has an outdoor lot. Long term parking is on North Harbor Drive to the east of the terminals and is served by shuttle buses.

Both terminals have designated areas for taxis and ride-share pickups.

Public transportation 
There are four public transportation options:
 Metropolitan Transit System Route 992: operates between Downtown San Diego, Terminal 1, Terminal 2 East, and Terminal 2 West. Route 992 operates from 5 a.m. to 11:30 p.m. with buses arriving every 15 minutes on weekdays and every 30 minutes on weekends and holidays. Route 992 connects to several major stations in Downtown San Diego:
 Santa Fe Transit Center (Santa Fe Depot & America Plaza station) served by Amtrak, Coaster, the Blue Line and Green Line of the San Diego Trolley, and Rapid buses
 City College Transit Center served by the Blue Line and Orange Line of the San Diego Trolley, and Rapid buses
 Metropolitan Transit System bus Route 923: operates between Ocean Beach and just outside the airport on North Harbor Drive from 5:45 a.m. to 6:30 p.m. with buses arriving every 30 minutes. On weekdays, buses extend into Downtown San Diego.
TERMINAL → TROLLEY shuttle: buses serving the rental car center make a stop at the corner of Admiral Boland Way and West Palm Street, one block (about ) from the Middletown station.
San Diego Flyer shuttle: buses operate between Old Town Transit Center, Terminal 1, Terminal 2 East, and Terminal 2 West with buses arriving every 20 to 30 minutes. At Old Town Transit Center passengers can transfer to Amtrak, Coaster, along with Blue Line and Green Line trains of the San Diego Trolley.
Extension of the San Diego Trolley, which goes across the street from the airport runway, to directly serve the airport terminals, has been proposed several times but has not yet come to fruition. A 2021 study has found that such an extension to the airport is feasible and could be completed within ten years.

Military
Coast Guard Air Station San Diego is near the southeast corner of the airport. The installation originally supported seaplane operations, with seaplane ramps into San Diego Bay, as well as land-based aircraft and helicopter operations using the airport's runway. The air station is separated from the rest of the airfield, which required aircraft to cross North Harbor Drivea busy, six-lane city streetat a traffic signal in order to reach the runway. This was a common occurrence during the 1970s, 1980s, and early 1990s, when the station had HH-3F Pelican and HH-60J Jayhawk helicopters and HU-25 Guardian jets assigned.  Following 9/11, the gate was closed and the traffic signals removed because the Coast Guard station no longer supports fixed wing operations.

Airline Support Building
The  Airline Support Building, which houses cargo operations and storage areas for aircraft provisions, and serves as a pick up and drop off point for live animals and large cargo, opened on July 20, 2021. Located on the south side of the airfield along North Harbor Drive, the building counts among its cargo tenants Alaska Airlines, American, Delta, Hawaiian, Lufthansa, Southwest, Sun Country, and United. The design-build project to construct the facility was awarded to SUNDT construction in 2018 for approximately $130 million.

Other facilities
BBA Aviation's Signature Flight Support (previously known as Landmark Aviation) is the fixed-base operator (FBO) at San Diego International Airport. It services all aircraft, from the single-engine Cessna aircraft to the Airbus A350. Generally, it services corporate traffic to the airport. The FBO ramp is at the northeast end of the airfield.

Stormwater is captured on Terminal 2 Parking Plaza and used in the cooling towers that heat, ventilate and air condition the terminals and jet bridges.

A portion of the southeast infield at San Diego International Airport is set aside as a nesting site for the endangered California least tern. The least tern nests from March through September. The birds lay their eggs in the sand and gravel surface at the southwest end of the airfield. The San Diego Zoological Society monitors the birds from May through September. The terns nest on the airfield because they do not have to compete with beachgoers, and the airport fence keeps dogs and other animals out, while the airplane activity helps keep predatory hawks away from the nests. Approximately 135 nests were established there in 2007.

Airlines and destinations

Passenger

Cargo

Statistics

Top destinations

Airline market share

Airport traffic

Accidents and incidents
On April 29, 1929, a Ford Trimotor operated by Maddux Air Lines collided in mid-air with a PW-9D shortly after taking off from Lindbergh Field. The aircraft collided over Downtown San Diego, killing all 5 aboard the Trimotor and the USAAC pilot of PW-9D. According to eyewitness accounts shortly before the collision the Air Corps pilot had been flying extremely close to the larger airliner in an impromptu show for viewers on the ground, when he misjudged the distance between the two aircraft and crashed into it.
On June 2, 1941, the first British Consolidated LB-30 Liberator II, AL503, on its acceptance flight for delivery from the Consolidated Aircraft Company plant in San Diego, crashed into San Diego Bay when the flight controls froze, killing all five of the civilian crew: Consolidated Aircraft Company's chief test pilot William Wheatley, co-pilot Alan Austen, flight engineer Bruce Kilpatrick Craig, and two chief mechanics, Lewis McCannon and William Reiser. Craig had been commissioned a 2nd Lieutenant in the US Army Reserve in 1935 following Infantry ROTC training at the Georgia Institute of Technology, where he earned a Bachelor of Science degree in aeronautical engineering. He had applied for a commission in the US Army Air Corps before his death; this was granted posthumously, with the rank of 2nd Lieutenant. On August 25, 1941, the airfield in his hometown of Selma, Alabama was renamed Craig Field, later Craig Air Force Base. Investigation into the cause of the accident caused a two-month delay in deliveries, resulting in the Royal Air Force not receiving Liberator IIs until August 1941.
On May 10, 1943, the first Consolidated XB-32 Dominator, 41–141, crashed on take-off at Lindbergh Field, likely from failure of the flaps. Although the bomber did not burn when it piled up at end of runway, Consolidated's senior test pilot Dick McMakin was killed. Six others on board were injured. This was one of only two twin-finned B-32s (41–142 was the other); all subsequent planes had a PB4Y-style single tail.
All 6 members of the Consolidated Vultee test crew were killed, including pilot Marvin R. Weller, co-pilot Conrad C. Cappe, flight engineers Frank D. Sands and Clifford P. Bengston, radio operator Robert B. Skala, and Consolidated Vultee field operations employee Ray Estes. A wing panel landed on a home at 3121 Kingsley Street in Loma Portal. The cause was found to be 98 missing bolts; the wing was only attached with four spar bolts. Four employees who either were responsible for installation, or were inspectors who signed off on the undone work, were fired two days later. A San Diego coroner's jury found Consolidated Vultee guilty of "gross negligence" by vote of 11–1 on January 5, 1945, and the Bureau of Aeronautics reduced its contract by one at a cost to firm of US$155,000. Consolidated Vultee paid out US$130,484 to the families of the six dead crew.
On April 5, 1945, the prototype Ryan XFR-1 Fireball, BuNo 48234, on a test flight over Lindbergh Field, lost skin between the front and rear spars of the right wing, interrupting airflow over the wing and causing it to break apart. Ryan test pilot Dean Lake bailed out as the airframe disintegrated. The wreckage struck a brand new Consolidated PB4Y-2 Privateer, BuNo 59836, just accepted by the US Navy and preparing to depart for the modification center at Litchfield Park, Arizona. The bomber caught fire and the four man Navy crew was forced to evacuate the burning PB4Y, with Aviation Machinist J. H. Randall suffering first, second, and third degree burns and minor lacerations while the rest of the crew was uninjured.
On April 30, 1945, just before midnight, the first production Consolidated PB4Y-2 Privateer, BuNo 59359, was being prepared on the ramp at Lindbergh Field for a flight to Naval Air Station Twin Cities in Minneapolis, Minnesota. The mechanic suffered severe burns. Only the number four (outer right) engine was deemed salvageable. The cause was an unqualified mechanic attempting a task that only a qualified electrician should perform.
On August 5, 1952, Convair B-36D-25-CF Peacemaker, 49-2661, returning from a pre-delivery test after being modified for the San-San project, suffered an uncontrollable engine fire in the right wing while attempting to land at Lindbergh Field. The #4 and #5 engines fell off the aircraft as the Convair test crew steered the crippled bomber towards the ocean. Seven of the eight crew on board bailed out, with Pilot David H. Franks heroically electing to stay with the aircraft to prevent it turning back towards the heavily populated coast, but flight engineer W.W. Hoffman drowned before he could be rescued. A USAF accident investigation was inconclusive, with a failure in the #5 engine's alternator, supercharger, fuel or exhaust systems suggested as possible causes.
On July 15, 1953, the prototype Convair XP5Y-1 Tradewind seaplane, BuNo 121455, on a test flight off Point Loma after taking off from the water next to Lindbergh Field, fractured an elevator torque tube rendering the aircraft uncontrollable. All 9 on board bailed out safely and were rescued.
On November 4, 1954, an experimental Convair YF2Y Sea Dart seaplane, BuNo 135762, on a demonstration flight for Navy officials over San Diego Bay after taking off from the water next to Lindbergh Field, disintegrated in mid-air after its pilot inadvertently exceeded the airframe's structural limits. Convair test pilot Charles E. Richbourg was pulled from the water but did not survive.
On September 25, 1978, a Boeing 727-200 operating flight PSA Flight 182 on the Sacramento–Los Angeles–San Diego route collided in mid-air with a Cessna 172 while attempting to land at San Diego Airport. The two aircraft collided with 727 above the Cessna over San Diego's North Park neighborhood, killing all 135 people on Flight 182, the two people in the Cessna, and seven people on the ground. An NTSB accident investigation found the probability of the accident's cause was that PSA flight crew's failure to inform the tower they had lost sight of the Cessna, in contradiction to Air Traffic Control instructions to "keep visual separation" from the smaller aircraft. Other factors named were errors on the part of ATC, including the use of pilot-maintained visual separation when ATC-monitored radar clearances were available, and an unexpected turn by the Cessna that put it directly in the path of the 727.

See also

 California World War II Army Airfields
 Tijuana International Airport

Notes

References

External links

 
 Flight planner section of the airport's website
 The Ambassablog – official Airport Authority employee blog
 Airliners.net – search for San Diego under Photo Search and see the colorful past of San Diego airport through the years
 IMDB movie: Billy Wilder's The Spirit of St. Louis, starring James Stewart, 1957
 
 

 
Airports established in 1928
Airports in San Diego
Airfields of the United States Army Air Forces in California
USAAF Contract Flying School Airfields
Airfields of the United States Army Air Forces Air Transport Command in North America
Charles Lindbergh
1928 establishments in California
Proposed California High-Speed Rail stations